Bejubang -- also known as Bajubang -- is a town and district (kecamatan) of the Batang Hari Regency in the Jambi Province of Sumatra, Indonesia. Nearby towns and villages include Muara Bulian (6.4 nm), Muarasingoan (9.5 nm), Kuap (13.0 nm), Talangpelempang (11.0 nm), Tempino (11.0 nm), Betung (5.0 nm) and Pinangtinggi (9.0 nm) 
.

References

External links
Satellite map at Maplandia.com

Populated places in Jambi